Paolo Maria Martinez (17711833) was a Spanish-Italian military and patron.

Biography 
Paolo Martinez was appointed noble guard by Pius VII in 1801.
He became a Priore dei Caporioni in 1819 and Conservatore of Rome in 1829. He was remembered for the bequest of 12,000 scudi made in favor of the San Giacomo degli Incurabili in 1833 by a plaque in the hospital and a monument in Santa Maria del Popolo.

References

Bibliography 
 

19th-century Spanish nobility
Nobility from Rome
Italian philanthropists
1771 births
1833 deaths
Italian knights